Večeras vas zabavljaju muzičari koji piju (English: "Tonight You Will Be Entertained by Musicians Who Drink") is the fifth studio album from Serbian and former Yugoslav rock band Riblja Čorba.

The album was polled in 1998 as the 80th on the list of 100 greatest Yugoslav rock and pop albums in the book YU 100: najbolji albumi jugoslovenske rok i pop muzike (YU 100: The Best albums of Yugoslav pop and rock music).

Background and recording
Although the band's guitarist Momčilo Bajagić had already started his solo career, he contributed greatly to this album by authoring two and co-writing another two songs. Also, drummer Vladimir Golubović, who worked with Bajagić on his solo album Pozitivna geografija, temporarily replaced Vicko Milatović, who was doing a mandatory service in the army. Večeras vas zabavljaju muzičari koji piju would be the only album recorded with Golubović and the last album before Bajagić and Rajko Kojić left the band.

As Riblja Čorba's record label PGP-RTB did not want to finance recording in London, the band moved to Jugoton. However, Večeras vas zabavljaju muzičari koji piju would be the only album the band released through Jugoton.

In his autobiography Uživo!: Autobiografija (Live!: Autobiography) the band's bass guitarist Miša Aleksić described the atmosphere at the recording sessions:

Track listing

Reception and controversy
Immediately after the album's release, state censorship board declared the songs "Mangupi vam kvare dete" and "Besni psi" "ethically unacceptable". "Besni psi" in particular caused a protracted international scandal. Because of the lyrics "Grčki sverceri, arapski studenti, negativni elementi, maloletni delikventi i besni psi" ("Greek smugglers, Arab students, negative elements, juvenile delinquents, and mad dogs"), the embassies of three Arab countries as well as Zaire protested, complaining that songwriter Bora Đorđević had equated foreign students in SFR Yugoslavia with mad dogs. The Yugoslav Ministry of culture ordered an expert analysis of the song.

With a somewhat darker atmosphere, the album was not nearly successful as Riblja Čorba's previous albums, bringing only one hit, Momčilo Bajagić's gentle ballad "Kad hodaš".

Legacy
The album was polled in 1998 as the 80th on the list of 100 greatest Yugoslav rock and pop albums in the book YU 100: najbolji albumi jugoslovenske rok i pop muzike (YU 100: The Best albums of Yugoslav pop and rock music).

In 2006, the song "Kad hodaš" was ranked #4 on the B92 Top 100 Domestic Songs List.

Personnel
Bora Đorđević - vocals
Rajko Kojić - guitar
Momčilo Bajagić - guitar
Miša Aleksić - bass guitar
Vladimir Golubović - drums

Additional personnel
Kornelije Kovač - keyboards, producer
Bob Painter - recorded by
Aco Razbornik - recorded by

References

Večeras vas zabavljaju muzičari koji piju at Discogs
 EX YU ROCK enciklopedija 1960-2006,  Janjatović Petar;  
 Riblja čorba,  Jakovljević Mirko;

External links
Večeras vas zabavljaju muzičari koji piju at Discogs

Riblja Čorba albums
1984 albums
Jugoton albums
Albums recorded in Slovenia